The Hawkeye Street Underpass is a historic structure located south of Nora Springs, Iowa, United States. The Illinois Central Railroad arrived in Nora Springs in 1868, and the Burlington, Cedar Rapids & Northern Railway (BCR&N) arrived three years later. The later was acquired by the Chicago, Rock Island & Pacific Railroad in the early 1880s. This stone masonry arch underpass was constructed by the Rock Island Line in 1889 as part of an upgrade of the tracks. It was designed by F.A. McDonald who had worked for the BCR&N.  It is the only known stone arch bridge in Floyd County. The bridge was listed on the National Register of Historic Places in 1998.

References

Bridges completed in 1889
Road bridges in Iowa
Bridges in Floyd County, Iowa
National Register of Historic Places in Floyd County, Iowa
Railroad bridges on the National Register of Historic Places in Iowa
Arch bridges in Iowa
Stone arch bridges in the United States